Shahrak-e Kowsar (also Romanized as Shahrak-e Kows̱ar) is a village in Mahur Berenji Rural District, Sardasht District, Dezful County, Khuzestan Province, Iran. At the 2006 census, its population was 1,506, in 283 families.

References 

Populated places in Dezful County